WCNH (90.5 FM) is a radio station airing a classical music format licensed to Concord, New Hampshire, broadcasting on 90.5 MHz. The station is owned by New Hampshire Public Radio, Incorporated.

History
This frequency was started by St. Paul's School as WSPS when the Federal Communications Commission granted the school a construction permit for a new 10-watt noncommercial educational radio station on July 5, 1972. The station began broadcasting in June 1974.

On April 5, 2021, after the donation of this facility by the school—which could no longer maintain WSPS—to New Hampshire Public Radio, WSPS became WCNH (and the former WCNH became WSPS), with the Classical New Hampshire service adding 80,000 additional people to its coverage area.

References

External links

CNH
Concord, New Hampshire
Classical music radio stations in the United States
Radio stations established in 1974
1974 establishments in New Hampshire